Abareia is a monotypic moth genus belonging to the family Pyralidae. It was described by Paul E. S. Whalley in 1970. It contains only one species, Abareia amaurodes, described by Alfred Jefferis Turner in 1947, which is found in Australia.

References

Phycitini
Monotypic moth genera
Moths of Australia
Pyralidae genera